

Crown
Head of State - Queen Elizabeth II

Federal government
Governor General - Edward Schreyer then Jeanne Sauvé

Liberal cabinet - to September 16
Prime Minister -  Pierre Trudeau then John Turner
Deputy Prime Minister - Allan MacEachen then Jean Chrétien
Minister of Finance - Marc Lalonde
Secretary of State for External Affairs - Allan MacEachen then Jean Chrétien
Secretary of State for Canada - Serge Joyal
Minister of National Defence - Jean-Jacques Blais
Minister of National Health and Welfare - Monique Bégin
Minister of Regional Industrial Expansion - Ed Lumley
Minister of the Environment - Charles Caccia
Minister of Justice - Mark MacGuigan then Donald Johnston
Minister of Transport - Lloyd Axworthy
Minister of Communications - Francis Fox then Ed Lumley
Minister of Fisheries and Oceans - Pierre de Bané then Herb Breau
Minister of Agriculture - Eugene Whelan then Ralph Ferguson
Minister of Public Works - Roméo LeBlanc then Charles Lapointe
Minister of Employment and Immigration - John Roberts
Minister of Indian Affairs and Northern Development - John Munro then Doug Frith
Minister of Energy, Mines and Resources - Charles Caccia then Gerald Regan
Minister of State (Forestry) - Gerald Merrithew

Progressive Conservative cabinet - from September 17
Prime Minister - Brian Mulroney
Deputy Prime Minister - Erik Nielsen
Minister of Finance - Michael Wilson
Secretary of State for External Affairs - Joe Clark
Secretary of State for Canada - Walter McLean
Minister of National Defence - Robert Coates
Minister of National Health and Welfare - Jake Epp
Minister of Regional Industrial Expansion - Sinclair Stevens
Minister of the Environment - Suzanne Blais-Grenier
Minister of Justice - John Crosbie
Minister of Transport - Don Mazankowski
Minister of Communications - Marcel Masse
Minister of Fisheries and Oceans - John Fraser
Minister of Agriculture - John Wise
Minister of Public Works - Roch La Salle
Minister of Employment and Immigration - Flora MacDonald
Minister of Indian Affairs and Northern Development - David Crombie
Minister of Energy, Mines and Resources - Pat Carney

Parliament
See: 32nd Canadian parliament then 33rd Canadian parliament

Party leaders
Liberal Party of Canada - Pierre Trudeau then John Turner
New Democratic Party- Ed Broadbent
Progressive Conservative Party of Canada - Brian Mulroney

Supreme Court Justices
Chief Justice: Bora Laskin then Brian Dickson
William McIntyre
Bertha Wilson
Antonio Lamer
Gerald Eric Le Dain (sworn in May 5)
Roland Almon Ritchie (until October 30)
John Sopinka
Jean Beetz
Julien Chouinard
Gerald Eric Le Dain

Other
Speaker of the House of Commons - Jeanne Sauvé then Cyril Lloyd Francis then John William Bosley
Governor of the Bank of Canada - Gerald Bouey
Chief of the Defence Staff - General G.C.E. Thériault

Provinces

Premiers
Premier of Alberta - Peter Lougheed
Premier of British Columbia - Bill Bennett
Premier of Manitoba - Howard Pawley
Premier of New Brunswick - Richard Hatfield
Premier of Newfoundland - Brian Peckford
Premier of Nova Scotia - John Buchanan
Premier of Ontario - Bill Davis
Premier of Prince Edward Island - James Lee
Premier of Quebec - René Lévesque
Premier of Saskatchewan - Grant Devine

Lieutenant-governors
Lieutenant-Governor of Alberta - Frank C. Lynch-Staunton
Lieutenant-Governor of British Columbia - Robert Gordon Rogers
Lieutenant-Governor of Manitoba - Pearl McGonigal
Lieutenant-Governor of New Brunswick - George F.G. Stanley
Lieutenant-Governor of Newfoundland and Labrador - William Anthony Paddon
Lieutenant-Governor of Nova Scotia - John Elvin Shaffner then Alan Abraham
Lieutenant-Governor of Ontario - Jean-Pierre Côté then John Black Aird
Lieutenant-Governor of Prince Edward Island - Joseph Aubin Doiron
Lieutenant-Governor of Quebec - Gilles Lamontagne
Lieutenant-Governor of Saskatchewan - Sylvia Fedoruk

Mayors
Toronto - Art Eggleton
Montreal - Jean Drapeau
Vancouver - Michael Harcourt
Ottawa - Marion Dewar

Religious leaders
Roman Catholic Bishop of Quebec - Cardinal Archbishop Louis-Albert Vachon
Roman Catholic Bishop of Montreal -  Cardinal Archbishop Paul Grégoire
Roman Catholic Bishops of London - Bishop John Michael Sherlock
Moderator of the United Church of Canada - W. Clarke MacDonald then Robert F. Smith

See also
1983 Canadian incumbents
Events in Canada in 1984
1985 Canadian incumbents
Governmental leaders in 1984
Canadian incumbents by year

1984
Incumbents
Canadian leaders